Thaidene Nene National Park Reserve (from the Dene, this Chipewyan name means land of our ancestors) is a national park in the vicinity of the east arm of Great Slave Lake, located on the northern edge of the boreal forest of Canada in the North Slave Region of the Northwest Territories. It is administered by Parks Canada and is part of the Thaidene Nëné Indigenous Protected Area, which also includes Territorial Protected Area and a Wildlife Conservation Area administered by the Government of the Northwest Territories. The National Park Reserve covers 14,070 km2 of nationally significant boreal forest, tundra, and freshwater ecosystems.

The creation of Thaidene Nene National Park Reserve works to protect caribou and pelt animals such as "lynx, wolf, red fox, wolverine, marten, moose and black bear". Other mammals inhabiting this park reserve include Arctic fox, beaver, muskox, grizzly bear and barren-ground caribou. The area features red granite cliffs, as well as "a spectacular array of peninsulas, canyons and waterfalls as the forests give way to northern tundra". Various migratory bird species also stage and nest in the area, including ducks and songbirds.

History
Consideration for the creation a  national park in the region was withdrawn in 1970 under the Territorial Lands Act, but in 2001 the Łutsël K'é Dene First Nation (previously Snowdrift) re-considered the proposal. Consultations for a feasibility study proceeded from 2002 to 2004, which drew the inclusion of the Métis Nation to the process. By 2005, the Łutselk'e produced a Band Council Resolution "supporting consideration of a national park as part of a broader protection initiative for their traditional territory", in cooperation with other Akaitcho First Nations. In 2006, the Łutselk'e Dene First Nation and the Minister of Environment and Minister Responsible for Parks Canada signed a Memorandum of Understanding which expanded the land withdrawal area for consideration for the national park by an additional  and defined a process for working together on matters pertaining to establishing a national park. Originally expected to be designated in 2009, by 2014 the negotiations still had yet to be finalized.

Public consultations on the smaller proposed boundaries finished in 2016. The federal government's 2016 budget named the Thaidene Nene proposal in its allocation of funds to help the National Park Reserve to realization.

On June 10, 2015, Parks Canada and the Northwest Territory Métis Nation negotiators reached an agreement in principle on most elements of an Impact and Benefit Agreement. The agreement is subject to internal review and consultation by both the NWTMN and Parks Canada.

The Government of Canada announced its proposed boundary for a national park reserve in the Thaidene Nene area on July 29, 2015 and launched formal consultations on the boundary.

On February 15, 2019, the Łutselk'e Dene First Nation voted to approve the creation of Thaidene Nene National Park Reserve. On 21 August 2019, an agreement was signed by Parks Canada, the Government of the Northwest Territories, and three First Nations (Lutsel K’e Dene First Nation, Deninu K'ue First Nation, and Yellowknives Dene First Nation) establishing a protected area consisting of a  national park administered by Parks Canada, and a  area administered by the territorial government that includes a wildlife conservation area.

See also
 List of national parks of Canada

References

External links

 Thaidene Nene National Park Reserve map
 Website for the proposed park, maintained by the community of Lutsel K’e

National parks in the Northwest Territories
Dene
2019 establishments in Canada
Protected areas established in 2019
Co-managed protected areas
North Slave Region
Taiga and boreal forests
Regions of the Subarctic